Campyloneurum oellgaardii is a species of fern in the family Polypodiaceae. It is endemic to Ecuador.  Its natural habitat is subtropical or tropical moist lowland forests. It is threatened by habitat loss.

References

oellgaardii
Ferns of Ecuador
Endemic flora of Ecuador
Ferns of the Americas
Vulnerable flora of South America
Taxonomy articles created by Polbot